Patti Murin (born September 28, 1980) is an American actress, singer and dancer. On Broadway, she has originated the title role in Lysistrata Jones (2011) and Princess Anna in Frozen (2018).  She also had a recurring role as Dr. Nina Shore in the NBC medical drama Chicago Med from 2016 to 2019.

Early life
Murin was born and raised in Hopewell Junction, New York, and graduated from Syracuse University in 2002, where she majored in musical theatre.

Career
Murin began her career in regional theatre, playing Polly in Crazy for You in Ft. Lauderdale, Florida.<ref>"Classic Disney musical enchants audiences" The Citizen", August 31, 2006</ref> Her Off-Broadway debut was in 2005 in the staged concert of the Elizabeth Diggs-Tom Jones-Harvey Schmidt stage musical Mirette with York Theatre Company. She next played Belle in a national tour of Beauty and the Beast (2006)

Murin made her Broadway debut in the musical Xanadu in 2007–2008 as a swing, understudy and then replacement in the leading role of Clio/Kira. In her next Broadway appearance, she originated the title role in Lysistrata Jones in 2012. Among other roles in regional and other stage productions, she played Glinda in the first national tour of Wicked (2012–2013). She played pathologist Nina Shore on the NBC medical drama television series Chicago Med, which she joined in 2016 and left in 2017.

Murin was the original Princess Anna in the musical Frozen which opened on Broadway at the St. James Theatre in March 2018. She also performed as Anna during the workshops and 2017 out of town tryout at the Buell Theatre in Denver, Colorado. Murin played her final performance in the role on February 16, 2020.

She appears in the Hallmark Channel film Love on Iceland with her husband Colin Donnell, which aired in January 2020.

Personal life
Murin's first husband was Curtis Holbrook, her co-star in the Broadway production of Xanadu. On June 19, 2015, Murin married her Love's Labour's Lost'' co-star Colin Donnell in New York City. Their daughter, Cecily, was born on July 14, 2020. In October 2022, the couple announced that Murin is pregnant with their second child.

Credits

Television

Theatre

Awards and nominations

References

External links
 
 
 
 

1980 births
American dancers
Living people
People from Hopewell Junction, New York
Dancers from New York (state)
21st-century American singers
21st-century American actresses
American musical theatre actresses